General elections were held in Mexico in 1900. Incumbent Porfirio Díaz was the only candidate for the presidency, and was re-elected with 100% of the vote.

Results

President

References

Mexico
General
Presidential elections in Mexico
Election and referendum articles with incomplete results